Pizhala is an island near Kochi surrounded by river Periyar. It is the central part and Capital  of Kadamakkudy Grama Panchyath, Kanayannur Taluk, Ernakulam District in the Indian state of Kerala. The name Pizhala is derived from the Portuguese words paz na ilha, which mean 'peace on island'.  Pizhala island was formed naturally due to the great floods of Periyar in 1341 AD, which choked the Muziris Port (near present-day Kodungallur), one of the greatest ports in Ancient World.

History

1341–1541
In 1341, The great flood in Periyar destroyed the Musiris Port.
The new port was created in Kochi along with many islands. The island got name in the period of Portuguese invasion. Arising of Christian community.

1741–1941
In 1859, due to order of The Vicariate of Verapoly Archbishop Bernardo (Giuseppe) Baccinelli, O.C.D, O.C.D Catholic missionaries constructed first school(Pallikkoodam) in Pizhala

Geography 
Pizhala is made up of A sedimentary sand. River Periyar sediments sand and mud in the time of flood on AD 1341. Pizhala is situated on the northern side of Kochi and the southern side of Varapuzha, the old headquarters of the Carmelite missionaries. This island is surrounded by the river Periyar.  Major portion of the island is wet land i.e. Pokkali Paddy Field. The island Pizhala includes South main land and North main land known as "Paliamthuruth".

Culture 
Jerry Amaldev stayed in Pizhala in his boyhood days. His uncle Fr. Joseph Moonjappilly was the parish priest of St. Francis Xavier's Church, Pizhala.

Before 2010, Pizhala has only two wards one is Pizhala South and Pizhala North. Paliyam Thuruth was included in Pizhala North Ward.

In 2010, Pizhala has divided into three wards, They are Pizhala South, Pizhala North and Paliyam Thuruth.

Education 
"Pallikoodam" established and Davassy Assan was the first teacher. It upgraded and is now known as St Francis UP School. People can study up to 7th standard. Students have been from Pizhala, Moolampilly and Chennur. Celebrated centenary of school in  March 2020. 
There are three Anganawadis in Pizhala Island. One is near to St. Francis UP school, Secondone is located near to Sree Vaishanava Temple and the last one is at Paliyamthuruth.

Religion 
Pizhala has a Protestant church, One Catholic Church named as St. Francis Xaviers Church, Moorthinkal Shree Vaishnava Kshethram owned by Kudumbi Community Temple, Shree Balabhadra  Temple controlled by Pulaya Community, and 8 other Family Temples.

Shree Balabhadra Temple 

Shree Balabhadra Temple is First Temple in Pizhala. It has a history of more than a century. It is situated near to the Primary Health Center at Pizhala. Shree Bala Bhadra Temple is controlled By Pulya Maha Sabha Community.  Shree Balabhadra Temple is opening for "pooja" on a couple of days in every month

Moorthinkal Shree Vaishnava Kshethram 

Moorthinkal Shree Vaishanava Kshethram, is important temple in Pizhala. This Temple was constructed on 1924 under Kudumbi Community. Total Area of this temple is around one acre. Maha Vishnu is the main worship god of this temple. "Bhagavathi", "Brahma Rakshas", "Nagayakshi" and "Naga raj" are the sub worship of it. Temple will open for worship every morning and evening.

Temple Festival 
Celebrate according to Shaka Varsha Calendar. It will conducted on Rohini star day in the month of Makham in Shaka Varsha Calendar. It is five day festival. It is very amazing Festival.

Manjakkuli or Holi

Nirapoothiri

St Francis Xaviers Church, Pizhala

Different Eras of  Catholic Church Pizhala

Family Temples

Agriculture 
Pokkali rice Cultivation on June to October Season. Fish and Shrimp Farming on October - April Season

Proverbs 
Because of The High Yield of  Pokkali Cultivation, This Proverb arose in Kadamakkudy Region.(പിഴലയിൽ പാഴില്ല) Nothing wasted in Pizhala

Economy and business 
Agriculture and fishing.
Pokkali Krishi
Kudumba Shree self-help groups are actively participating in the economy of Pizhala

Transport 
Moolampilly-Pizhala Ferry (south), Kothad-Pizhala Ferry (east), Kadamakkudy-Pizhala Ferry (north west) and Chariamthuruth-Chennur-Pizhala (north east)  Ferry are the four ferries which connect Pizhala island with the mainland. With the construction of Vallarpadam International Container Terminal Road, transportation has been made a little easier. The bridge between moolampilly and Pizhala is under construction. All piling work is over.
There is boat service between Ernakulam-Varapuzha and South Chittoor-Valiya Kadamakkudy.

Pizhala has two parts - Pizhala Mainland and Paliyamthuruthu.

Infrastructure

Pizhala is one of the backwards island in Ernakulam District even if it is naturally beautiful.

The Main Government Offices on Pizhala Island are:
Primary Health Centre (At Pizhala North Ward) 
Kadmakudy Grama Panchayath Office (KadamakkudyPanchayath)
Kadmakudy Village Office (Kadamakudy
Union Bank of India Branch
Pizhala Post Office Pin 682 027
Korampadam Service Co-operative Bank Ltd.No.178

References

External links 

 Pizhala Pokkali Tourism Farm
 For Pizhala islanders, wait for bridge continues
 CM to Inaugurate Construction of Goshree Bridges
 Aid across water
 How Oommen Chandy’s Davos fall scuttled a bridge dream
 for Kadamakkudy Panchayath Details
 for Shiju Manuel Details
 for Shiju Manuel Release
 http://www.madhyamam.com/en/node/25329
 http://www.tehelka.com/kerala-drug-trafficking-gulf-case-study-1/

Islands of Kerala
Cities and towns in Ernakulam district
Neighbourhoods in Kochi
Islands of India
Populated places in India